The Apure River is a river of southwestern Venezuela, formed by the confluence of the Sarare and Uribante near Guasdualito, in Venezuela, at , and flowing across the Llanos into the Orinoco. It provides significant transportation in the area.

Origin
The Oirá River starts in Venezuela and its thalweg forms that border for several kilometres downstream. The Uribante River is longer than the Sarare and flows from the Táchira-Mérida border, near the town of Pregonero. The Apure's drainage area thus includes the slopes of both the Colombian (less than 0.5 percent of its total area) and the Venezuelan Andes.

Course

From the point where the Uribante joins the Sarare, the Apure flows eastward across the Venezuelan llanos, into the Orinoco. From the north, its principal tributaries are the Caparo, Portuguesa and Guarico. The Caucagua is its only major tributary from the south. Because of the flatness of the land its meanders and bayous to the south are mingled with those of the Arauca River creating an extensive area which is flooded annually. However, both rivers keep independent channels during dry season.

Notes

References 
Acosta Saignes, Miguel. ¿Cómo se descubrió el río Apure?. Revista Nacional de Cultura, N° 86, pp. 71–78.
Bingham, Hiram. On the route of Bolívar’s great march: Caracas to Bogotá via Arauca and the Páramo of Pisva. London: The Geographical Journal, oct, 1908, pp. 329–347.
Carvajal, (fray) Jacinto. Relación del descubrimiento del río Apure hasta su ingreso en el Orinoco. Escrita en 1648 y editada en León (España) en julio de 1882. Editada también en Madrid: Edime, 1956.
De León, Rafael; Rodríguez Díaz, Alberto: El Orinoco aprovechado y recorrido. Caracas: Ministerio de Obras Públicas, Corporación Venezolana de Guayana, 1976
Rodríguez Díaz, Alberto J. Desarrollo del eje de navegación Orinoco-Apure-Arauca. Informe Preliminar. Caracas: Vol. I, Ministerio del Ambiente y de los Recursos Naturales Renovables, 1980.
Rodríguez Díaz, Alberto J. y De Leon, Rafael. Apuntes para los estudios de navegación por el sistema Orinoco-Apure: Tramo Ciudad Guayana- Guasdualito. Caracas: M.O.P., Dirección de Recursos Hidráulicos, Oficina de Planeamiento, Estudios Río Orinoco, 1975.
Zinck, Alfred. Los ríos de Venezuela. Caracas: Cuadernos Lagoven, 1982, 2ª edición.
Zinck, Alfred. Valles de Venezuela. Caracas: Cuadernos Lagoven, 1980
Vila, Pablo. Geografía de Venezuela. I. Caracas: Ministerio de Educación, 1960

Rivers of Colombia
Rivers of Venezuela
Orinoco basin
San Fernando de Apure
International rivers of South America